White Stuff s the eleventh studio album by American band Royal Trux. It was released on March 1, 2019, through Fat Possum Records.

It is the band's first album in 19 years.

Track listing

Charts

References

2019 albums
Royal Trux albums
Fat Possum Records albums